The Quran is the central religious text of Islam, believed by Muslims to be a revelation from God.

Earliest translation of Quran was done by companion of Prophet Muhammad, Salman Al Farsi in Persian. Translation of Quran into Hebrew was done first in 19th centuary.

Initiation of Translation
The first translation of the Quran into Hebrew was completed by a German Jewish scholar named Hermann Reckendorf in 1857 from Leipzig.

Translation in Timeline

In 19th centuary
1857:- By Hermann Reckendorf from Leipzig.

In 20th centuary
1936: A translation from Yosef Yoel Rivlin.  

1971: Ha-Ḳurʼan ha-ḳadosh: sefer ha-sefarim shel ha-Iślam (The Holy Qurʼān: The Great Book of Islam) in Hebrew by Aharon Ben Shemesh from Israel.

In 21st centuary
2005: A translation of Quran Uri Rubin, from Israel. 

2015: Ha Qoran Bi Lashoon Akher from Subhi Ali Adawi. Published from Jordan.  

2018: Ha Qoran translated by Asad Nimr Basul. Published from Kingdom of Saudi Arabia. 

2019: A group of Translators. Published by Goodword books.

Upcoming
 A Translation from Egypt.

See more
 Islam
 Quran
 List of translations of the Quran

References

Quran translations by language
Hebrew-language literature